The ABC countries, or ABC powers, are the South American countries of Argentina, Brazil, and Chile, seen as the three most powerful, influential and wealthiest countries in South America. The term was mostly used in the first half of the 20th century, when they worked together to develop common interests and a coordinated approach to issues in the region with relatively little influence from outside powers.

History
During the early 20th century Argentina, Brazil, and Chile engaged in a naval arms race, beginning with Brazil purchasing three dreadnoughts in response to the recently-concluded Argentine–Chilean naval arms race.

The Niagara Falls peace conference is the first well-known use of the term "ABC". On May 20, 1914, the three countries met in Niagara Falls, Ontario, Canada, to mediate between the United States and Mexico after increasing tensions over the  Tampico Affair, the United States occupation of Veracruz, and developing issues that led to the Mexican Revolution. At the conference, the United States was represented by Frederick William Lehmann, a former United States Solicitor General, and Joseph Rucker Lamar, an Associate Justice of the Supreme Court of the United States.

In 1942 the ABC countries, with the United States, mediated in the peace terms of the Ecuadorian–Peruvian War. This led to the loss of all disputed territory in the Amazon Basin that was claimed by Ecuador before the war.

See also
Andean Community
Argentina–Brazil relations
Argentina–Chile relations
Brazil–Chile relations
Mercosur
Southern Cone

References

External links
The resurrection of the ABC countries, 2003
so-called "ABC" nations
Mentioned in: Storming Media, Chile Consultants, UMaryland, Carlisle
Hélène Veber: ABC Pact (Alliance between Argentina, Brazil and Chile), In: 1914–1918 Online. International Encyclopedia of the First World War

Political terminology
Foreign relations of Argentina
Foreign relations of Brazil
History of the foreign relations of Chile
History of the foreign relations of the United States
1914 in Mexico
Foreign relations of Mexico
Mexican Revolution
Banana Wars
Argentina–Brazil relations
Argentina–Chile relations
Brazil–Chile relations